Anthony Mark Shandran (born 17 September 1981) is an English footballer, who plays for Bedlington Terriers. He plays as a striker.

External links

1981 births
Living people
Sportspeople from North Shields
Footballers from Tyne and Wear
English footballers
Association football forwards
Burnley F.C. players
St Patrick's Athletic F.C. players
League of Ireland players
Stalybridge Celtic F.C. players
York City F.C. players
Spennymoor United F.C. players
Gateshead F.C. players
Newcastle Benfield F.C. players
Newcastle Blue Star F.C. players
Blyth Spartans A.F.C. players
Bedlington Terriers F.C. players
English Football League players
Northern Premier League players
Northern Football League players